Gisèle Lamoureux,  (October 5, 1942 – June 23, 2018) was a Canadian photographer, botanist and ecologist.

Biography
Born in Montreal, Quebec, Lamoureux studied at the Université de Montréal and the Université Laval.

She is the founder of Guides Fleurbec which made their debut in the 1970s. She is an activist for the protection of wild garlic since 1979, an initiative taken up when the Quebec law for the protection of endangered species was enacted.

Awards and honours
1989 - Prix Georges-Préfontaine from the Association des biologistes du Québec
1996 - Knight of the Ordre national du Québec
1997 - Mérite de la conservation de la flore from the Quebec Ministry of Environment
1998 - Honoris causa Doctor of Sciences of the Université Laval
1999 - Made a Member of the Order of Canada for having "contributed to the protection of Canada's exceptional environment".
2015 - Prix Georges-Émile-Lapalme

Selected bibliography 

 G Lamoureux, R Larose. Flore printanière. 2001. Fleurbec
 Gisèle Lamoureux and Patrick Nantel. Cultiver des plantes sauvages sans leur nuire (French). 1999. Fleurbec.

Selected academic publications 

 Gisèle Lamoureux and Miroslav M. Grandtner. Contribution à l'étude écologique des dunes mobiles. I. Les éléments phytosociologiques. Canadian Journal of Botany, 1977, 55(2): 158-171
 Gisèle Lamoureux and Miroslav M. Grandtner. Contribution à l'étude écologique des dunes mobiles. II. Les conditions édaphiques. Canadian Journal of Botany, 1978, 56(7): 818-832.
 Gisèle Lamoureux and Estelle Lacoursière. Etude préliminaire des groupements végétaux caractérisant quelques gîtes larvaires à moustiques dans la région de Trois-Rivières (Québec). Canadian Journal of Botany, 1976, 54(3-4): 177-190.

References

External links 
  Site of Fleurbec

1942 births
2018 deaths
French Quebecers
Artists from Montreal
Canadian ecologists
Knights of the National Order of Quebec
Members of the Order of Canada
Scientists from Montreal
Women ecologists
Canadian women photographers
20th-century Canadian women scientists
21st-century Canadian women scientists
Université Laval alumni
Université de Montréal alumni